Scott Helmore Hobson (born 7 April 1967 in Christchurch) is a former field hockey player from New Zealand, who finished in eighth position with the Men's National Team, nicknamed Black Sticks, at the 1992 Summer Olympics in Barcelona, Spain.

His father, Noel Hobson, represented New Zealand in field hockey at the 1956 and 1960 Olympic Games.

References

External links
 
 

1967 births
Living people
New Zealand male field hockey players
Olympic field hockey players of New Zealand
Field hockey players at the 1992 Summer Olympics
Field hockey players from Christchurch
20th-century New Zealand people
21st-century New Zealand people